is a Japanese ice hockey player. He competed in the men's tournament at the 1998 Winter Olympics.

References

1967 births
Living people
Japanese ice hockey players
Olympic ice hockey players of Japan
Ice hockey players at the 1998 Winter Olympics
Asian Games silver medalists for Japan
Medalists at the 1990 Asian Winter Games
Ice hockey players at the 1990 Asian Winter Games
Asian Games medalists in ice hockey
Sportspeople from Aomori Prefecture